Satyarup Siddhanta (born 29 April 1983) is a Bangalore-based Indian mountaineer.  Satyarup became the youngest mountaineer in the world and the first from India to climb both the Seven Summits as well as Volcanic Seven Summits on 15 January 2019 at 10:10 pm Chile time. Guinness World record approved this claim.

On 15 December 2017 he summited Vinson Massif, becoming only the fifth Indian civilian to complete the seven summits (Messner's List and Bass List). He is the first civilian to accomplish this feat from Karnataka (Residence State) and West Bengal (Home State).  Satyarup, a certified mountaineer from Himalayan Mountaineering Institute, Darjeeling has skied the last degree to South  Pole, a distance of 111 km.

Satyarup became:

 First from India to complete Volcanic Seven Summits
 First from India to climb Mt Sidley, highest volcano of Antarctica
 First from India to climb Mt Giluwe, the highest volcano of Papua New Guinea
 First from India to climb Mt Wilhelm, the highest mountain of Papua New Guinea
 Third from India to climb Mt Ojos Del Salado, the highest volcano in the world, at Chile
 First person to play the Indian National Anthem on flute in Antarctica

Biography

Early life 
Satyarup Siddhanta was born in Kolkata and brought up in a small town, Berhampore, West Bengal (now Baharampur). He did his schooling at Mary Immaculate School, Berhampore and passed Higher Secondary from Gurudas Tarasundari Institution, Berhampore. He obtained a B.Tech in Computer Science and Engineering from Sikkim Manipal Institute of Technology, Sikkim. He started working as a software engineer in Bangalore in 2005 and has been an active member of Bangalore Mountaineering Club since 2008.

Works and achievements 
Satyarup has been awarded the highest state award in the field of mountaineering Radhanath Sikdar Tenzing Norgay Adventure Award 2016 by the State Youth Services Department, Govt of West Bengal.

Satyarup has been awarded the Excellence in Mountaineering award, 2018 by State Youth Services Department, Govt of West Bengal

Satyarup has been awarded with the special award in mountaineering 2019 by the Chief Minister of West Bengal at Khelasree 2019 held at Netaji Indoor Stadium Kolkata.

Satyarup was presented with the Youth Award in the Bangalore Youth Festival at the Kanteerva Stadium.

Satyarup has been invited by IIT Kanpur in their prestigious Scholars in Residence Program 2019-20.

He was felicitated by the West Bengal Commission for Protection of Child Rights (WBCPCR) in Kolkata on the occasion of State Child Protection Day on 9 June 2018. He dedicated his Kilimanjaro, 2018 climb to the cause of Child Protection and held aloft the WBCPCR poster at the summit.

He played the Indian National Anthem on flute amidst extreme climatic conditions in Antarctica.

Satyarup presented his poster at the International Centre for Integrated Mountain Development.

ASEAN entrusted Satyarup and his team the mission to take the ASEAN flag, the Indonesia Flag and the India flag to the summit of Mt Carstensz Pyramid as a commemorative climb to mark the 50th Anniversary of ASEAN and 25th anniversary of Dialogue with India.  Satyarup gave a talk at the ASEAN headquarters, Jakarta. As a mark of respect, the pictures of the flag giving ceremony is showcased on the walls of Indian High Commission, Indonesia.

He was felicitated by the Governor of West Bengal after he successfully climbed Mount Everest on 21 May 2016.

He has been delivering motivational talks at several renowned institutions and forums, like ASEAN, SAHA Institute of Nuclear Physics, IISc, Bangalore, IIT Kanpur, IISWBM, IEI, TEDX and corporates like Cognizant, Sasken, HSBC, Bandhan Bank, IET, Altimetrik, Pinnacle, IMRB, Trivium, Element14, Aditya Birla Capital, Students of Indian Museum etc.

Mountaineering timeline

The seven highest summits 
 29 June 2012 and 14 June 2018 : Mount Kilimanjaro (5,885m/19,308 ft) Summit. On 29 June 2012, at 9:30 a.m, Satyarup led a team of nine to Mount Kilimanjaro, the highest peak of Africa from the Machame Route.  On 14 June 2018, he led a team of 5 to the top again via the same route.
 27 June 2013: Mount Elbrus (West summit:18,510 ft/5,642m and East summit:18,442 ft/5621m). On 27 June 2013, Satyarup summitted the highest mountain of Europe.
 13 January 2014: Mount Aconcagua (22,841 ft/6962m). Satyarup climbed Mount Aconcagua, the highest non-technical mountain in the world on 13 January 2014 unguided from the normal route.
 23 June 2014: Mount Denali  (20,322 ft/6194m). Satyarup climbed Mount Denali on 23 June 2014 from West Buttress route unguided.
 12 June 2015: Mount Kosciuszko (7,310 ft/2,228m) Satyarup successfully climbed the highest peak in Australia by the normal route unguided on 12 June 2015. 
 21 May 2016: Mount Everest (29,029 ft / 8,848m) Satyarup successfully climbed the highest peak  of Everest, taking the standard route from Nepal Side on 21 May 2016.
 13 June 2017:Carstensz Pyramid (16024 ft / 4884m)  Satyarup successfully climbed the highest peak of Oceania by the Suangama Jungle Route. It was a commemorative climb to celebrate 50 years of ASEAN and 25 years of Bilateral talk between India and ASEAN. The flag giving ceremony happened at the headquarters of ASEAN at Jakarta where Satyarup was handed 3 flags - The India flag, the Indonesia flag and the ASEAN flag.
 15 December 2017 Vinson Massif (16,050 ft/4,892m) Satyarup successfully climbed the highest peak in Antarctica, taking the normal route and completing the seven summits.

The seven volcanic summits 
 Mt Kilimanjaro (Africa) twice on 29 June 2012 & 14 June 2018
 Mt Elbrus (Europe) on 27 June 2013
 Mt Ojos Del Salado (South America) on 15 January 2018 - 2nd Indian to summit after Malli Mastan Babu
 Mt Damavand (Asia) on 10 September 2018 - Led a woman's team from India
 Mt Giluwe (Oceania) on 9 November 2018 - 1st Indian to summit
 Mt Pico De Orizaba (North America) on 5 December 2018 (Indian time: 2:09 am on 6 December 2018)
 Mt Sidley (Antarctica) on 15 January 2019, 10:10 pm Chile time, 2019

Other notable adventures 

 23 September 2014: Mount Blanc in France
 28 December 2017: Skied the Last Degree to South Pole covering 111 km distance over 6 days and dragging a 50 kg sled 
 15 January 2018: Became the second Indian to climb the highest volcano of the world, Mt. Ojos Del Salado, Chile
14 November 2018: Became the 1st Indian to climb Mount Wilhelm, the highest peak of Papua New Guinea.

Controversy 
In 2016, Satyarup was initially denied the certification of having climbed Everest due to the alleged forgery of Rathod couple from Maharashtra. Satyarup lodged a complaint against the police couple who morphed his pictures from the summit. After a thorough investigation, a case was lodged against the duo under Section 66(d) of Information Technology Act, 2008. A ten-year ban from mountaineering was imposed on the couple by Nepal Tourism.

See also
Indian summiters of Mount Everest - Year wise
List of Mount Everest summiters by number of times to the summit
List of Mount Everest records of India
List of Mount Everest records

References  

Bengali sportspeople
Indian mountain climbers
1983 births
Living people
Indian summiters of Mount Everest
Summiters of the Seven Summits